The Calexico Outlaws were a professional independent baseball team based in Calexico, California, representing that city and Mexico.  They played in the developmental Arizona Winter League, a short-season instructional winter league affiliated with the North American League and played in the International Division, as well as the San Diego Surf Dawgs, San Luis Atleticos, Saskatchewan Silver Sox and Team Canada.   The team plays their home games in 2012 at Desert Sun Stadium in Yuma, Arizona.   Their team colors are black, red and white and they don the uniforms of the now-defunct Chico Outlaws.  The team disbanded in 2013.

Season-By-Season Records
Arizona Winter League:

References

External links
 Arizona Winter League's official website
 North American Baseball League

Professional baseball teams in California
Calexico, California
Arizona Winter League teams
Baseball teams established in 2012
Baseball teams disestablished in 2013
2012 establishments in California
2013 disestablishments in California
Defunct baseball teams in California